Maqbool Hossain is a Bangladesh Jamaat-e-Islami politician and the former Member of Parliament of Jessore-2.

Birth and early life 
Maqbool Hossain was born in Jessore District.

Career 
Maqbool Hossain was elected to parliament from Jessore-2 as a Bangladesh Jamaat-e-Islami candidate in 1986. He was defeated by taking part in the fifth parliamentary election.

See also 

 Jatiya Sangsad

References

External links 
 List of 3rd Parliament Members -Jatiya Sangsad (In Bangla)

People from Jessore District
Bangladesh Jamaat-e-Islami politicians
3rd Jatiya Sangsad members
Living people
Year of birth missing (living people)